Kaiyuan is a word from Chinese phonetic alphabet (pinyin) with multiple meaning due to different forms of Chinese characters. It may refer to:

Places
 Kaiyuan, Liaoning (开原), a county-level city in Liaoning, China 
 Kaiyuan, Yunnan (开远), a county-level city in Yunnan
 Kaiyuan Subdistrict, Xiamen (开元街道), a subdistrict in Siming District, Xiamen, Fujian
 Kaiyuan District (开元区), former district in Xiamen, Fujian
 Kaiyuan, Shulan (开原镇), town in Shulan, Jilin
 Kaiyuan, Dingzhou (开元|镇), in Dingzhou

Other uses
 Kaiyuan era (713-741), early in the reign of Emperor Xuanzong of the Tang Dynasty 
 Kaiyuan Za Bao, the Tang Dynasty's official publication during the Kaiyuan era
 Kaiyuan coin, a standard coin of the Tang Dynasty
 Kaiyuan Temple (disambiguation) (开元寺), the name of various Chinese temples